Lava Glacier is located on the north slopes of Mount Adams a stratovolcano in Gifford Pinchot National Forest in the U.S. state of Washington. Lava Glacier has been in a general state of retreat for over 100 years and lost 74 percent of its surface area between 1904 and 2006.

Lava Glacier was named by Harry Fielding Reid during his survey of Mount Adams' glaciers with C. E. Rusk in 1901.

See also 
List of glaciers in the United States

References 

Glaciers of Mount Adams (Washington)
Mount Adams (Washington)
Gifford Pinchot National Forest
Glaciers of Yakima County, Washington
Glaciers of Washington (state)